The Waseges River (or Sandai River) is a river that rises on the slopes of the Nyandarua Plateau below the Aberdare Range in Kenya. The river flows north, then west and south to enter Lake Bogoria in the Great Rift Valley from the north after passing through a swamp.
In 2002 rubies were found in the region of the Waseges River.

Climate

In its upper reaches the Waseges flows through regions of intensive coffee cultivation where heavy use is made of chemical fertilizers and pesticides.
Lower down it flows through bush and scrub used for grazing, and then through very dry bush before entering the lake at its northern end.
The river is seasonal, and is the main affluent of the lake.
The inertial flow of the river may generate counter-clockwise currents in the lake.

Irrigation scheme

The Waseges is an important source of irrigation water. With rising populations, by 1985 the Tugen people of Sandai were sometimes refusing to allow their neighbors, the Camus people, to use water from the river.
The Sandai farmers had been in the habit of cultivating two or three out of six cultivated areas each year.
A given area would be farmed for three or four years, then left fallow for up to four years. All the areas are fed by canals from the Waseges, but half the canals will be blocked at any time.
Use of the irrigated farm areas involved agreements between the Tugen and Camus people.

An irrigation scheme carried out by the Baringo District Provincial Irrigation Unit (PIU), funded and given technical support by Dutch Aid, aimed to improve usage of the river waters.
The planned irrigation scheme was based on a single large concrete-lined canal feeding just one area.
Scheduled for launch in 1983, there were delays due to protests from the local people, and the project was not completed until the 1987/1988 season. The project introduced a less flexible system, created tensions between the Tugen and Camus people, and tensions among the Tugen.

In 2003 the river was illegally diverted for irrigation upstream in the Subukia area, causing it to dry up downstream during a period of drought. The Ministry of Water Management and Development proposed to establish river basin catchment committees and water user associations to manage use of the river.

References

Sources

Rivers of Kenya